This article contains lists of achievements in major senior-level international water polo tournaments according to first-place, second-place and third-place results obtained by teams representing different nations. The objective is not to create combined medal tables; the focus is on listing the best positions achieved by teams in major international tournaments, ranking the nations according to the most podiums accomplished by teams of these nations.

Results
For the making of these lists, results from following major international tournaments are consulted:

 FINA: Fédération internationale de natation
 IOC: International Olympic Committee

Medals for the demonstration events are NOT counted. Medals earned by athletes from defunct National Olympic Committees (NOCs) or historical teams are NOT merged with the results achieved by their immediate successor states. The International Olympic Committee (IOC) does NOT combine medals of these nations or teams.

The tables are pre-sorted by total number of first-place results, second-place results and third-place results, then most first-place results, second-place results, respectively. When equal ranks are given, nations are listed in alphabetical order.

Men and women

*Defunct National Olympic Committees (NOCs) or historical teams are shown in italic.

Men

*Defunct National Olympic Committees (NOCs) or historical teams are shown in italic.

Women

See also
 Major achievements in Olympic team ball sports by nation
 List of major achievements in sports by nation
 List of water polo world medalists
 FINA Water Polo World Rankings

References

External links
 Water polo | fina.org – Official FINA website

 *
Achievements
Water polo